Adrian Foster (born 19 March 1971 in Kidderminster) is an English footballer and manager. He played several seasons in the Football League during the 1990s before dropping down into non-league football.

In December 2013, he was appointed manager of Frome Town having previously managed Gillingham Town. Six months after arriving at Frome as manager, he was rewarded with a new two-year contract in May 2014.

References

1971 births
Living people
Sportspeople from Kidderminster
English footballers
West Bromwich Albion F.C. players
Torquay United F.C. players
Gillingham F.C. players
Exeter City F.C. players
Hereford United F.C. players
Rushden & Diamonds F.C. players
Yeovil Town F.C. players
Forest Green Rovers F.C. players
Bath City F.C. players
Frome Town F.C. players
Taunton Town F.C. players
Street F.C. players
Chard Town F.C. players
English football managers
Gillingham Town F.C. managers
Frome Town F.C. managers
Association football forwards